Alan Gregov (born April 1, 1970) is a Croatian retired basketball player.

Alan Gregov has won the silver medal with the Croatia national basketball team at the 1992 Summer Olympics in Barcelona, Spain, a bronze medal at 1994 FIBA World Championship and a bronze medal at EuroBasket 1993.

His uncle is Petar Popović, former Croatian basketball player.

References

External links 
 Biography

Croatian men's basketball players
Olympic basketball players of Croatia
Apollon Patras B.C. players
Aris B.C. players
Basketball players at the 1992 Summer Olympics
Olympic silver medalists for Croatia
1970 births
Living people
Olympic medalists in basketball
Asseco Gdynia players
Croatian expatriate basketball people in Poland
Croatian expatriate basketball people in Greece
Basketball players from Zadar
KK Cibona players
KK Zadar players
KK Split players
KK Włocławek players
Medalists at the 1992 Summer Olympics
1994 FIBA World Championship players